The 2002 New York gubernatorial election was held on November 5, 2002. Republican Governor George Pataki was re-elected to a third term, defeating Democrat Carl McCall and Rochester billionaire Tom Golisano, who ran on the Independence Party line. , this was the last time a Republican won a statewide election in New York, and the last time Albany, Tompkins and Westchester counties have voted Republican in a statewide election.

On Election Day, Pataki was easily re-elected, but fell short of receiving 50% of the vote. McCall received 33% of the vote, carrying New York City (other than Staten Island) and nearly carrying Albany County. In contrast to the norm for multiple third party campaigns, Golisano did better than his previous elections, receiving 14% of the vote and carrying his home county of Monroe in western New York.

Republican primary

Candidates
George Pataki, Governor of New York since 1995

Declined
Rudy Giuliani, former Mayor of New York City (1994–2002)

Polling

Results 
Pataki won the nomination unopposed.

Democratic primary

Candidates 
 Carl McCall, New York State Comptroller

Withdrew 
 Andrew Cuomo, former U.S. Secretary of Housing and Urban Development and son of Mario Cuomo

Campaign 
Comptroller Carl McCall defeated Andrew Cuomo at the Democratic State Convention, and Cuomo withdrew from the race less than a week before the Democratic primary.

Polling

Lieutenant Governor

Results

Other nominations

Conservative and Independence 
Besides his standard Republican nomination, Governor Pataki sought the nominations of the Conservative and the Independence Party. Golisano, who sought (and ultimately won) the nomination of the Independence Party, also ran against the Governor in the Conservative primary, spending over $20 million (or over $2,000 per vote) during the primaries. Pataki secured the Republican and Conservative lines, while Golisano successfully defended his hold on the Independence Party ticket.

Liberal 
Andrew Cuomo was nominated by the Liberal Party before his withdrawal from the race, and his withdrawal came too late for his name to be removed from the Liberal Party line. Since Liberal Party supporters could not support McCall on their own party's line (and thus ensure that the Liberal Party would maintain ballot access by virtue of having 50,000 votes or more), Cuomo's defeat effectively helped to destroy the Liberal Party.

General election

Predictions

Polling

Results

Results by county

Counties that flipped from Republican to Independence 
 Monroe (largest city: Rochester)

See also
Governorship of George Pataki

Notes

References

External links
Columbia University Graduate School of Journalism coverage of election
Gotham Gazette coverage of election
Marist Poll coverage of election

New York
2002
Gubernatorial
Andrew Cuomo